Udai Bhan (born 2 November 1955) is state president of Haryana state unit of Indian National Congress. He has represented the Hodal Vidhan Sabha Constituency in Haryana Legislative Assembly in 13th assembly (2014-2019).
Earlier he has represented Hassanpur Vidhan Sabha Constituency in 1987, 2000, 2005.

Early life
Mr Udai Bhan was born in Hodal in Palwal distt. in Haryana. His father Mr. Gaya Lal was a member of the Haryana Legislative Assembly from the Hodal constituency in Palwal district. Contesting as an Independent candidate from Hassanpur, reserved for Scheduled Castes (SCs), Gaya Lal defeated the Congress’s M Singh by 360 votes, garnering 10,458 votes against Singh’s 10,098 votes. Days later, he joined the Congress. Mr Udai Bhan's grandfather Chaudhary Dharam Singh was also a noted politician and elected the chairman of Hodal municipal corporation several times between 1928 to 1942.

Political career

Udai Bhan fought and won his first assembly election from Hassanpur in 1987 as a candidate of Lok Dal under the leadership of Chaudhary Devi Lal and won the seat twice thereafter — in 2000 as an Independent candidate and later in 2005 as a Congress candidate. Udai Bhan was the chairman of the Krishak Bharati Cooperative (KRIBHCO) between 1989 and 1993 and joined the Congress in 1997. Bhan won the Hodal (reserved) seat as a Congress candidate in 2014 but lost in the last assembly election to the BJP’s Jagdish Nayar with a very small margin of 3,387 votes. He actively supported 2020–2021 Indian farmers' protest which was a protest against three farm acts that were passed by the Parliament of India in September 2020. On 19 November 2021, the union government decided to repeal the bills,[64] and both houses of Parliament passed the Farm Laws Repeal Bill, 2021 on 29 November.

In April, 2022 Udai Bhan was appointed new state President of Haryana unit of Indian National Congress.

Personal life
Udai Bhan is married to Shakuntala Devi and they have 3 sons and one daughter.
Bhan’s elder son Raj Gopal and his younger son Devesh Kumar have also been in public life and been associated with the Congress. Udai Bhan’s elder son Raj Gopal served as chairman, Municipal Council, Hodal, from 2016 to 2019.

References 

Members of the Haryana Legislative Assembly
1955 births
Living people